The Roman Catholic Church in Scotland comprises two ecclesiastical provinces each headed by a metropolitan archbishop. The provinces in turn are subdivided into 6 dioceses and 2 archdioceses, each headed by a bishop or an archbishop, respectively.

List of Dioceses

Ecclesiastical province of Saint Andrews and Edinburgh
Archdiocese of Saint Andrews and Edinburgh
Diocese of Aberdeen
 Diocese of Argyll and the Isles
 Diocese of Dunkeld
 Diocese of Galloway

Ecclesiastical province of Glasgow 
 Archdiocese of Glasgow
 Diocese of Motherwell
 Diocese of Paisley

See also
Roman Catholicism in Scotland
List of Roman Catholic dioceses (alphabetical) (including archdioceses)
List of Roman Catholic dioceses (structured view) (including archdioceses)
List of Roman Catholic archdioceses (by country and continent)
List of Roman Catholic dioceses in Great Britain
Bishops' Conference of Scotland
Nunciature to Great Britain
:Category:Roman Catholic cathedrals in Scotland

References
Edinburgh Statistics
Glasgow Statistics
Catholic-Hierarchy entry.
GCatholic.org.

Scotland
Catholic dioceses